The 3Ds were a New Zealand noise pop band based from Dunedin, together from 1988 to 1997. They recorded three albums and several EPs, the best known of which is The Venus Trail (1993). They achieved commercial and critical success worldwide in the period between 1992 and 1995.

History
The band was formed in May 1988 by Dominic Stones, Denise Roughan and David Saunders. The band's name refers to the members' names all starting with "D". In 1989, they were joined by David Mitchell from Auckland bands Exploding Budgies and Goblin Mix, who introduced the twin-guitar attack which became the defining feature of the group. He also created all EP and album artwork apart from Fish Tales which featured a painting by Jane Davidson. Among their inspirations, in addition to the Pixies, they also consider Black Sabbath and Fairport Convention to be inspirations.

Their first recordings were demos, one of which, "Meluzina Man", became their first release on the 1990 compilation Xpressway Pileup.
The band's first release for the Flying Nun label was the EP Fish Tales at the beginning of 1990, beginning a long collaboration with the label in Dunedin. Their second EP, Swarthy Songs for Swabs, and the first album, Hellzapoppin', were released over the next two years.

The first tour in the United States was in 1992, followed by an Australian tour with the Lemonheads.

In 1992, the band played with Nirvana in New Zealand.
 
Their second album was The Venus Trail, released in 1993. This included their best known singles "Hey Seuss" and "Beautiful Things."

In 1994, they returned to the U.S. for a three-month tour.

The 3Ds toured with Pavement in New Zealand and Australia. Following this, The 3Ds played two stadium shows supporting U2 on their Zoo TV tour in New Zealand. An associate of the band took a bottle of champagne from U2's dressing room without permission, leading the concert promoter to inform The 3Ds that they would not be paid for their performance. However, Bono was in the room at the time and insisted that The 3Ds be paid double, and given an additional bottle of champagne.

In 1997, the band released its third album, Strange News from the Angels.

The band announced it was splitting up in early 1997.

In July 2009, the 3Ds reformed to play two shows at the Merge Records 20th anniversary festival in Chapel Hill, North Carolina.

In 2010, the 3Ds toured New Zealand, including the inaugural Laneways festival. This was followed by an invitation to play at the Pavement-curated All Tomorrows Parties festival in the UK.

Discography

Albums

EPs

Compilations

Featured appearances
 (1995) Abbasalutely (Flying Nun Records) - "Mama Mia"
 (1997) Topless Women Talk About Their Lives (Flying Nun Records) - "Hey Seuss", "Animal" and "Spooky"
 (1999) Scarfies (Flying Nun Records) - "Outer Space"

Singles

Members
 Dominic Stones — drums
 Denise Roughan — bass guitar, keyboards, tambourine, vocals
 David Saunders — guitar, vocals
 David Mitchell — guitar, mandolin, vocals

References

External links
Flying Nun Records website
3Ds myspace page
Merge Records website

New Zealand indie rock groups
Flying Nun Records artists
ThreeDs
Merge Records artists
Musical groups established in 1988